The 2013–14 FIU Panthers men's basketball team represented Florida International University during the 2013–14 NCAA Division I men's basketball season. The Panthers, led by first year head coach Anthony Evans, played their home games at U.S. Century Bank Arena, and were first members of Conference USA.

Due to APR penalties, they were ineligible for a post-season berth, including the 2014 Conference USA men's basketball tournament.

They finished the season 15–16, 7–9 in C-USA play to finish in a three way tie for eighth place.

Roster

Schedule

|-
!colspan=9 style="background:#002D62; color:#C5960C;"| Regular season

References

FIU Panthers men's basketball seasons
Florida International
FIU Panthers men's b
FIU Panthers men's b